

Primera División

Champion: Nacional (42nd title)
Top scorer: Joaquín Boghossian (16 goals)
International qualifiers:
Copa Libertadores:
Group Stage: Nacional and Cerro
Preliminary Round: Racing
Copa Sudamericana:
First Stage: River Plate and Liverpool
Widest winning margin: Tacuarembó 0-5 Cerro (February 28, 2009)
Highest scoring: Bella Vista 5−2 Cerro Largo (November 9, 2008)
Most wins: Defensor Sporting and Nacional (21)
Fewest wins: Rampla Juniors and Villa Española (3)
Most draws: Liverpool and Racing (12)
Fewest draws: Villa Española (3)
Most losses: Juventud (21)
Fewest losses: Racing (6)
Most goals scored: Nacional (68)
Fewest goals scored: Villa Española (11)
Most goals conceded: Rampla Juniors and Juventud (60)
Fewest goals conceded: Villa Española (26)
Best goal difference: Cerro (+31)
Worst goal difference: Juventud (-36)
Relegated: Villa Española, Bella Vista, Juventud

International tournaments

Second Division

Teams

These are the teams that currently participate in Uruguayan Second Division:

 Atenas
 Basañez (withdraw)
 Boston River
 Cerrito
 Deportivo Maldonado
 Durazno FC
 El Tanque Sisley
 Fénix
 Huracán Buceo

 Miramar Misiones
 La Luz Tacurú FC (withdraw)
 Plaza Colonia
 Progreso
 Rentistas
 Rocha FC
 IASA

Final positions

Teams promoted to 2009/2010 First Division
 Fénix (Apertura champion)
 Cerrito (Clausura champion)
 Atenas (won promotion playoff against Durazno)

Uruguay national teams
This section will cover Uruguay's games from August 1, 2008 until June 30, 2009.

Uruguay

Friendly matches

2010 World Cup qualifiers

Uruguay U-20

World Cup qualifiers
The Uruguay under-20 squad is in Group B of the qualification process for the Final Group of 2009 South American Youth Championship.

First Group stage

Final group

Uruguay U-17

World Cup qualifiers
The Uruguay under-17 squad is in Group B of the qualification process for the Final Group of 2009 South American Under-17 Football Championship.

First Group stage

Final group

References

External links
 AUF
 FIFA.com
 Diario El Pais
 Tenfiel Digital.com
 Uruguayan Players in the World